Lot 19 is a township in Prince County, Prince Edward Island, Canada.  It is part of St. David's Parish. Lot 19 was awarded to brothers John and Walter Patterson in the 1767 land lottery. One quarter was granted to Loyalists in 1783.

Communities

Incorporated municipalities:

 Kensington
 Sherbrooke
 Summerside

Civic address communities:

 Burlington
 Clermont
 Kelvin Grove
 Kensington
 Margate
 New Annan
 Norboro
 Sherbrooke
 Summerside
 Travellers Rest
 Wilmot Valley

Demographics
The unincorporated communities of Travellers Rest, New Annan, Wilmot Valley and Kelvin Grove in the western part of the township is one of the few areas in Prince County experiencing a modest rate of growth, largely due to their geographic proximity to the town of Kensington and the city of Summerside.

In 2001 the township had a population of 1,775 residents. In 2006 the population was 1,888 and as of 2011 it has a population of 1,903 marking an increase of 128 residents, or a growth rate of approximately 13% over the last 10 years.

References

19
Geography of Prince County, Prince Edward Island